Bruno Corra is the pseudonym of Bruno Ginanni Corradini (Ravenna, 9 June 1892 – died in Varese, 20 November 1976), an Italian writer and screenwriter.

Career
The son of Count Tullio Ginanni Corradini (who was also mayor of Ravenna) and brother of Arnaldo Ginna (the names Corra and Ginna were suggested by Giacomo Balla by assonance with the words running and gymnastics), he spent his childhood and most of the youth in the hometown, adding to the more regular studies work with anarchists, dealing with all the learning, literature, art, philosophy, theosophy.

At the end of 1912 he founded with Mario Carli and Emilio Settimelli the magazine The Centaur, which aimed at the expression of a non-dogmatic conception of art. In 1916, he participated in the making of the film Futurist Life, in collaboration with Balla and Marinetti, a film produced and directed by Ginna (now for this film there are only a few frames).

In 1915 he published the novel Sam Dunn is dead, (Sam Dunn è Morto). He left Futurism a few years after the end of the First World War, publishing novels and escapist comedies that got a decent success with the public, such as The Island of Kisses of 1918, written in cooperation with Marinetti, or The Passatore of 1929 (on Stefano Pelloni).

Filmography 

We invent love (1938)
Crossing Black (1939)
The miracle well (1949)
El hombre de las sorpresas (1949)
Deception (1952)

1892 births
1976 deaths
20th-century Italian screenwriters
Italian male novelists
20th-century Italian novelists
20th-century Italian male writers
Italian male screenwriters